The Tăușoare-Zalion Reserve is a cave system located in the deeply forested areas of the Rodna Mountains, Bistrița-Năsăud County, in Romania.

The Tăușoare Cave was discovered in 1955 by a teacher, Leon Bârte.

The cave features rare minerals, such as mirabilite and anthodites, being second in Romania in value of anthodites, after the Peștera Vântului in the Pădurea Craiului Mountains.

References

External links
Tăușoare-Zalion Reserve (archived at the Wayback Machine)
National Agency for Protected Natural Areas - Romania

Caves of Romania
Geography of Bistrița-Năsăud County